Women's Premier League may refer to:

Association football
FA Women's Premier League, a football league in England now known as the FA Women's National League
Women's Premier League (Singapore), women's football league in Singapore
Women's Premier League (Solomon Islands), women's football league in the Solomon Islands
Women's Premier Soccer League, in the USA
Welsh Premier Women's Football League, a women's football league in Wales

Other sports
Women's Premier League (cricket), a T20 cricket league in India 
Women's Premier League Rugby, United States
Women's Premier League, an ice hockey league in England and Wales